

Ion Păscăluță was a Bessarabian politician.

Biography 

He served as Member of the Moldovan Parliament (1917–1918).

Gallery

Bibliography 
Gheorghe E. Cojocaru, Sfatul țării: itinerar, Civitas, Chișinău, 1998, 
Mihai Tașcă, Sfatul Țării și actualele autorități locale, "Timpul de dimineață", no. 114 (849), June 27, 2008 (page 16)

External links 
 Arhiva pentru Sfatul Tarii
 Deputații Sfatului Țării și Lavrenti Beria

Notes

Moldovan MPs 1917–1918
Year of death missing
Year of birth missing